The Portia White Prize is the largest prize of its type awarded by the Province of Nova Scotia and is named for Portia White, a Nova Scotian artist who rose through adversity to achieve international acclaim as a classical singer on the stages of Europe and North America. Although Portia White began her career teaching in Africville, she eventually turned her energy to developing her enormous musical talent. Portia White became a world-renowned contralto through much hard work and dedication and the financial support of the Nova Scotia Talent Trust, a charitable organization created in 1944 by the Halifax Ladies Music Club, the music community and the Province. Upon retiring from the stage, Ms. White devoted her time to teaching and coaching young singers. Her achievements continue to instill a sense of pride in the African Nova Scotian community and stand as a model to all Nova Scotians.

The purpose of the Portia White Prize is to recognize cultural and artistic excellence on the part of a Nova Scotian artist who has attained professional status, mastery and recognition in their discipline. To enable the province of Nova Scotia to promote excellence in the arts by honouring an outstanding Nova Scotian artist who has made a significant contribution to the province’s cultural life.

The primary recipient, who is an established artist, either born in Nova Scotia or resident in the province for at least the past four years, will receive $18,000 and a certificate of recognition.

A secondary recipient, also called the "protégé", who is an emerging Nova Scotian artist or a Nova Scotian cultural organization selected by the primary recipient, will receive $7,000 and a certificate of recognition.

Recipients
2020 Afua Cooper

2013      Laurie Swim
2012      Thom Fitzgerald
2011      James MacSwain 
2010    Mary Jane Lamond 
2009	Mary Vingoe
2008    Walter Ostrom 
2007	Joleen Gordon
2006	Wayne Boucher
2005	Walter Borden
2004	Jim Morrow
2003	Charlotte Wilson-Hammond
2002	Sylvia Hamilton
2001	Alistair MacLeod
2000	Garry Kennedy
1999	Georg Tintner
1998	George Elliott Clarke

References

External links

Nova Scotia awards
Canadian art awards